Pursuant to Article 51 of the Law on Internal Regulations of the Islamic Consultative Assembly (Parliament of the Islamic Republic of Iran), the Program, Budget and Accounting Commission of the Islamic Consultative Assembly shall be formed to perform the assigned tasks within the scope of the country program, country budget, supervision of the program and budget and the Court of Accounts and Finance of the Assembly, and to provide statistics and general technical services in accordance with the provisions of the regulation.

In addition to performing specialized duties, the Program, Budget and Accounting Commission is obliged to take action on the following matters:

 Supervise and monitor the implementation of budget and financial regulations of the Assembly and how to spend it
 Review the performance of the annual budget of the Assembly and submit its report by the end of the sixth month of the next year at the latest
 Careful inspection and supervision of all movable and immovable property and objects of the Assembly and submission of an annual report for printing and distribution among the representatives
 Nomination of two candidates for the chairman position and two candidates for the Prosecutor position of the Supreme Audit Court of Iran to be selected by the Assembly

Members 
The members of the Program, Budget and Accounting Commission of the Islamic Consultative Assembly in the second year of the 11th term of the Assembly are as follows:

See also 
 Specialized Commissions of the Parliament of Iran
 Education, Research and Technology Commission of the Islamic Consultative Assembly
 Internal Affairs of the Country and Councils Commission of the Islamic Consultative Assembly
 Social Commission of the Islamic Consultative Assembly
 Joint Commission of the Islamic Consultative Assembly
 Special Commission of the Islamic Consultative Assembly
 Integration Commission of the Islamic Consultative Assembly
 The history of the parliament in Iran

References

Committees of the Iranian Parliament
Islamic Consultative Assembly
Public Accounts Committees